Rainhill railway station serves the district of Rainhill in Merseyside, England.  It is situated on the electrified northern route of the Liverpool to Manchester Line, forming part of the Liverpool City Line. The station, and all trains serving it, are operated by Northern Trains on behalf of Merseytravel and are branded as Merseytravel services.

Rainhill has an important place in railway history, as the location of the Rainhill Trials where the proposed designs of locomotive for the Liverpool and Manchester Railway were tested in competition.

History
Rainhill station was opened in 1830 as part of the Liverpool and Manchester Railway, and is one of the oldest passenger railway stations in the world. These early intermediate stations were often little more than halts, usually positioned where the railway was crossed by a road or turnpike. This probably accounts for variations in the names of these stopping places, The station was originally called Kendrick's Cross or Kendrick's Cross Gate but this name did not last long, according to Butt (1995) it was changed to Rainhill in 1831 and according to Holt (1965) it was known as Rainhill by 1838 but not formally changed to Rainhill until 1844.

The station buildings are listed, they were constructed about 1860-68 by the London & North Western Railway, in a classical style, red brick, English bond, stone dressings, shallow hipped Welsh slate roof, modillion eaves cornice, single storey, linear plan.

At the western end of the station George Stephenson designed and had constructed a skew arch bridge to take the Liverpool-Warrington-Manchester turnpike across the railway.  The bridge was the first skew to ever cross a railway and is now a listed building.

Facilities
As with most Merseytravel stations, it is fully staffed throughout the day (06:00 - 23:50 Mondays to Saturdays, 08:30 to midnight on Sundays). The booking office and waiting room is on the westbound platform, with a brick shelter on the opposite side and a lattice footbridge linking them.  Digital information displays, help points and timetable poster boards are located on each side and there is step-free access to both platforms.

Services
Rainhill is served by Northern Trains services between Liverpool Lime Street and either  via  or Warrington Bank Quay every half-hour on Monday to Saturday daytimes. Prior to the May 2014 timetable change, some trains continued beyond Manchester to destinations such as Stalybridge or Huddersfield. During the evenings there is an hourly service to Manchester Airport/Wilmslow and Liverpool. Services to/from Manchester Victoria are now limited and only run at peak times and early mornings/late evenings (since the May 2018 timetable change).

Following completion of electrification of the line in Spring 2015, the Liverpool to Manchester Airport/Crewe, Liverpool to Manchester Victoria and Liverpool to Warrington Bank Quay services are now operated by 4-Car Class 319 and 3-Car Class 323 Electric Multiple Units.

Gallery

See also
Listed buildings in Rainhill

Notes

Sources

External links

 

Railway stations in St Helens, Merseyside
DfT Category E stations
Former London and North Western Railway stations
Railway stations in Great Britain opened in 1830
Grade II listed railway stations
Northern franchise railway stations
1830 establishments in England